Brachyplatystoma platynemum, The slobbering catfish, is a species of catfish of the family Pimelodidae that ranges from Brazil, Colombia and Venezuela.

Distribution
It is native to Amazon, Orinoco, Meta, Caqueta, Putumayo, Guaviare, Guayabero, and Metica basins of Puerto Carreno, Inirida, Rio Meta and Pará, northwestern Brazil. It also founds in llanos of Colombia and Venezuela.

Description
It grows to a length of 1170 mm, where male is about 65 cm and females is 75 cm. Head compressed and elongate. Barbels long, large and flattened. Dorsal surface light grey or brown with lighter below with no spots or stripes on body. Caudal-fin deeply-forked with narrow lobes in adults.

Ecology
It is a potamodromous demersal fish that inhabits deepest channels of rivers with a sand substrate and stones and driftwood .

It is entirely piscivorous preying on Prochilodus, Anodua, and Astyanax genera.

References

Pimelodidae
Catfish of South America
Freshwater fish of Brazil
Taxa named by George Albert Boulenger 
Fish described in 1898